Paulhac-en-Margeride is a commune in the Lozère departement in southern France.

See also
Communes of the Lozère department

References

Paulhacenmargeride